UNNS — The Captivation is a 2017 novel by Sapan Saxena.

Background
Saxena had initially decided to write a sequel to his first book Finders, Keepers, but was persuaded by his family to write a romance novel. The story depicts two lovers who unknowingly take a stand against each other, and the love-hate relationship between them. 

In an interview with Half Baked Beans, Saxena described UNNS as “an unconventional love story”. In his interview with Hindustan Times, Saxena claimed “Unns is a story of love beyond any terms and conditions.”

Seven stages of love
UNNS touches on what is called the seven stages of love, as per Urdu and Sufi traditions:

 Hub — attraction
 Unns — infatuation
 Ishq — love
 Aqeedat — reverence
 Ibadat — worship
 Junoon — madness
 Maut — death

This concept is a common topic in Hindi movies, such as Dedh Ishqiya and Dil Se.

Plot summary
The novel depicts international espionage that conflicts with romance. The story spans across three countries: India, Germany, and the United States. 

Atharva Rathod and Meher Qasim fall in love when they are in school. However, their romance is short lived, as Meher abruptly breaks all ties with Atharva and leaves for Germany with no intent to return. Fifteen years later, Atharva travels to Germany on a secret mission, where he happened to meet Meher. The mission ends in failure, and Atharva is imprisoned for twelve years, on charges of acting against the Research and Analysis Wing of India. As Atharva is freed after serving his full sentence, his mentor entrusts him with an amateur mission in the United States where he meets Meher once again. 

The story is divided across three parts, each named after a season that symbolizes the maturity of love between the protagonists: spring, fall, and winter. Each part is further divided into seven sub-parts, each representing one of the seven stages of love, ending in death.

Characters
The main characters of the novel are:

 Atharva Rathod — senior secret agent with the Research and Analysis Wing (RAW) of India
 Meher Qasim — successful entrepreneur involved in the food supply chain business in Germany
 Dev — secret agent of the RAW
 Vasu — director of the RAW
 Ayaz — an orphan whom Atharva sets out to protect

Reception

Noted cartoonist and creator of Super Commando Dhruva, Anupam Sinha reviewed the book before its release and commented that it "will keep you at the edge of your seat".

Indian Express covered the launch in Chandigarh which was attended by Bharatiya Janta Party MP from Meerut, Shri Rajendra Agarwal.
The Chandigarh launch was also covered by Daily Post India in its Ludhiana chapter and Hindi daily Punjab Kesari in its Ludhiana chapter.

The book received fair to positive reviews after its launch. Daily Post India called the book truly captivating and commented, "Setting of the story and the sub-plots created all necessary elements." CNI Channel called the book "True to its name" and called it a "chaos of shrewd mind and innocent emotions."

Richa Sharma of Lucknow Bytes said that "The storyline isn't a hardcore tale of romance. It has its own share of thrill, suspense, fight and war." Samata Dey from IndiaCafe said, "Sapan has narrated the story well and managed to balance the element of romance and thrill in a perfect manner ensuring that the readers are not able to put the book down before finishing it." Adarsh Srivastava from Feeble Lines said that the "story moves with a constant pace with flashbacks and current events along with the twist and suspense at the end of almost every chapter". Jaideep Khanduja in Pebbles in the Still Waters said, "There are a good amount of twists in the story. In addition, it is full of suspense."

References

External links
 Inspire India Publishers — official website

2017 Indian novels